The 1983 Calgary Stampeders season was the 39th season for the Canadian Football League club. They finished in 4th place in the West Division with an 8–8 record and failed to make the playoffs.

Regular season

The Stampeders' 1983 season is best remembered for an upset loss at home completed in the last three minutes of the campaign that not only kept them out of the playoffs, but deprived Calgary of an opportunity to dethrone their bitter archrivals who were the five-time defending Grey Cup champions.

Calgary entered the final week of the season with an 8-7 record and were in third place in the West. The Edmonton Eskimos, despite being five-time defending champions, had struggled to an 8-8 record and were idle in the final week. With the cross-over rule not yet in effect, the Eskimos could thus only watch helplessly as their provincial rivals hosted the long-eliminated 4-11 Saskatchewan Roughriders needing only a tie to end Edmonton's season. Crucially however, Edmonton held any potential tiebreaker over Calgary on account of a slim advantage in points-for-and-against ratio in divisional games, thus ensuring Calgary would miss the playoffs with a loss by any margin.

Calgary stormed to an early 12-0 lead in the first quarter, but Saskatchewan came back and eventually tied the game 20-20 by the end of the third quarter. In the fourth quarter, the Stampeders scored three consecutive singles, the last of these coming with just 2:45 left on the clock. Since no overtime format was yet in force for the CFL regular season, Calgary at that point only needed to hold Saskatchewan to a field goal to reach the postseason. On their next possession however, the Stampeders turned the ball over on their own 43-yard line when a third-down snap bounced off the turf and was fumbled by punter Mike McTague. On their ensuing drive, which crucially included a successful third-and-eleven conversion from well within the field goal range of Saskatchewan kicker Dave Ridgway, the Roughriders scored a touchdown with 27 seconds remaining in the game. They then held off a final desperate Calgary drive to shock the Stampeders and their fans, 27-23, thus ending Calgary's season. 

Ultimately however, the Stampeders' miscue  extended the their rivals' dynasty by only one week as the Eskimos were throttled 49-22 by the Winnipeg Blue Bombers in the Western Semi-Final.

Season standings

Season schedule

Awards and records

1983 CFL All-Stars
LB – Danny Bass, CFL All-Star
DB – Richard Hall, CFL All-Star

References

Calgary Stampeders seasons
1983 Canadian Football League season by team